Gorazan-e Sofla (also Romanized as Gorāzān-e Soflá; also known as Gorāzān-e Pā’īn) is a village in Howmeh Rural District, in the Central District of Gilan-e Gharb County, Kermanshah Province, Iran. At the 2006 census, its population was 189, in 35 families.

References 

Populated places in Gilan-e Gharb County